The 1991 United States Grand Prix (formally the XXVIII Iceberg United States Grand Prix) was a Formula One motor race held on March 10, 1991 in Phoenix, Arizona. It was the first race of the 1991 Formula One World Championship. The 81-lap race was won from pole position by Ayrton Senna, driving a McLaren-Honda, with Alain Prost second in a Ferrari and Nelson Piquet third in a Benetton-Ford.

The race marked the respective debuts of future double World Champion Mika Häkkinen and the Jordan team. It was also the first F1 World Championship race in which ten points were awarded for a win rather than nine, as part of a revised scoring system introduced for 1991. However, it was also to be the last United States Grand Prix until 2000, due to poor attendances.

In the two previous years, the championship had been decided when Senna and Prost tangled at Suzuka. In 1989, their collision as team-mates secured Prost's third World Championship; in 1990, with Prost driving for Ferrari and still in title contention, it handed Senna his second crown. Controversy regarding the nature of the 1990 incident had created great anticipation for the rematch.

Qualifying

Pre-qualifying report
Several teams were required to participate in the Friday morning pre-qualifying sessions during 1991, in order to reduce the field to thirty cars for the main qualifying sessions on Friday afternoon and Saturday. At the midway point of the season, the pre-qualifying group was to be reassessed, with the more successful teams (over a twelve-month period consisting of the second half of 1990 and the first half of 1991) being allowed to avoid pre-qualifying thereafter, and less successful teams being required to pre-qualify from mid-season onwards.

Eight cars were to take part in pre-qualifying sessions during the first half of the 1991 season, after 1990 ended with no pre-qualifying sessions at the last two Grands Prix, due to the withdrawal of the EuroBrun and Life teams. Pre-qualifying was necessary again in 1991 due to the arrival of two new entrants: Jordan and Modena, which were entirely new teams, running two cars each. Another new name, Fondmetal, was essentially a continuation of the defunct Osella team and was running a single car. Also involved in pre-qualifying were Coloni, running one car, and Scuderia Italia, running two cars. These were the two least successful surviving teams over the past two half seasons. The fastest four cars would go through to the main qualifying sessions.

Jordan had signed veteran Italian driver Andrea de Cesaris, plus last season's Coloni driver Bertrand Gachot, who had much experience in pre-qualifying sessions. Their car was the all-new 191 powered by a Cosworth V8 engine. Modena's drivers were Italian Nicola Larini, another driver well used to pre-qualifying, and Belgian debutant Eric van de Poele. They would be driving the Lamborghini V12-engined Lambo 291, so named for the team's strong Lamborghini connections. Fondmetal had retained the French Osella driver Olivier Grouillard, and were starting the season with the Cosworth V8-powered Fondmetal FA1M-E, effectively last year's Osella, which itself was an update of their 1989 car. Coloni had brought the C4, a modified version of the C3 used in 1989 and 1990, which also had a Cosworth V8 engine. Their driver was the 1990 British Formula 3000 champion Pedro Chaves, from Portugal. Scuderia Italia were campaigning a Dallara chassis as usual, the all-new F191, powered by Judd V10 engines. The team retained Italian Emanuele Pirro, and hired Finnish driver JJ Lehto, who had driven for Onyx in 1990.

In pre-qualifying in Phoenix, the Dallaras were easily the fastest cars in the session, with Pirro half a second faster than Lehto. Nearly two seconds slower in third was Larini in the Modena Lambo, and the fourth pre-qualifier was Gachot in the Jordan. Missing out in fifth place was de Cesaris in the other Jordan, who made a gear selection error on a faster lap, just ahead of Chaves, who crashed the Coloni during the session. Grouillard was seventh in the Fondmetal, complaining of a lack of grip, but bottom of the time sheets, nearly five seconds adrift of Grouillard, was van de Poele in the other Lambo. The Belgian had encountered a protester on the track during one run, after which his engine failed.

Pre-qualifying classification

Qualifying report

Prior to arriving in Phoenix, the 1991 McLaren chassis had had only had one brief test session, and the two race cars were completed about 4 am Friday, six hours before the first practice session.  Working to prepare the new car, Ayrton Senna claimed he had never gotten totally comfortable with the increasing complexity of the sport since helping Lotus introduce the first active suspension car in 1987, and he still found it hard to embrace the huge role of computers in achieving a proper setup. "Friday, to understand and interpret things properly, I worked with the engineers into the evening," Senna said. "It has been a long time since I did that. The engineers and I talked our way around the circuit, then we compared this with what the computer predicted. It was great because the computer confirmed almost everything, and it also showed where there was room for improvement."The Ferraris of Alain Prost and Jean Alesi were expected to be the strongest team, but their V-12s and 7-speed semi-automatic gearboxes were not well suited to the tight turns and short straights of the street circuit. As it turned out, they were not the only ones plagued by gearbox problems throughout the race. To add insult to injury, Alesi, who had clinched the fastest time on Friday, ended his qualifying session clipping the tire barrier with his rear right wheel, ensuring he would qualify no higher than fifth place.

Qualifying classification

Race
Race report

On Sunday, Prost began his second season at Ferrari alongside Senna on the front row. At the start, he fell in behind the Brazilian, with Nigel Mansell slipping ahead of Riccardo Patrese. Alesi and Gerhard Berger followed, then Nelson Piquet, Roberto Moreno, Stefano Modena and Emanuele Pirro. A lap later, Alesi, in his first race for Ferrari, swept past Patrese, but by then Senna was pulling away. After ten laps, he had a lead of ten seconds over Prost.

Behind Senna, Patrese was involved in two successive three-way battles. First, after getting back by Alesi for fourth on lap 16, Patrese closed on Mansell who was immediately behind Prost. By lap 22, Patrese was close enough to attack his Williams team-mate but overshot onto the escape road, as Mansell swerved to avoid him. Upon rejoining, Patrese quickly latched onto Alesi and Berger, as the new three-car train now covered fourth through sixth places. Patrese had gotten past Berger when, suddenly, two of the top six runners retired on consecutive laps. On lap 35, Mansell pulled over when the Williams's new semi-automatic gearbox failed, and on the next time around, Berger's race ended as well.

Patrese passed Alesi for the second time, and Alesi pitted for new Goodyear tires on lap 43. He rejoined in seventh. Three laps later, Prost was being hounded by Patrese, and he also pitted, ceding second spot to the Williams. When the Ferrari crew had problems changing his right rear tire, the Frenchman dropped to seventh behind Modena's Tyrrell-Honda.

On lap 48, Senna pitted without giving up the lead. Like Mansell, Patrese was having problems with the gearbox in his Williams, and when it selected neutral midway through Turn Seven, it caused him to spin out of second place. The car stopped on the outside of the track, perpendicular to the racing line. Piquet and Mika Häkkinen (making his F1 debut) barely managed to avoid him as they passed, but before Patrese could get out of the car, Moreno, in the second Benetton, went straight across the bow of the Williams, removing the nose of Patrese's car and the right front wheel of the Benetton. Neither driver was injured.  Patrese and Moreno's cars remained on the course throughout the race, and Bertrand Gachot, driving the first race for the new Jordan team and challenging Satoru Nakajima, spun later after swerving to avoid them.

With Patrese out, Senna led Piquet, who was having to hold off Alesi, by over a minute. Alesi squeezed up to second on lap 53, while four laps later Prost disposed of Modena. Then on lap 70, Prost went from fourth to second in one move at turn five. With Alesi and Piquet running second and third, Piquet's Benetton pulled alongside Alesi– who had set the race's fastest lap while Prost was in the pits– in Turn Four, but could not get by. Down the straight, however, Piquet passed Alesi for second place. Prost also went by his new teammate on the left, and then sliced back to the right, between Alesi and Piquet, beating Piquet to the apex of Turn Five and regaining second place. By now Senna led by 40 seconds.

Gearbox troubles dropped Alesi to fifth before he retired less than 10 laps from the finish, leaving third place to Piquet who, like the two Tyrrells following, had never pitted for tires. Martini was pressing Satoru Nakajima for fifth, only to have his engine let go after 75 laps. A similar problem removed Gachot from eighth on the same lap, promoting Aguri Suzuki to sixth. The race ended a lap short of the planned 82 as the two-hour limit was reached, Senna taking the win having led every lap.

After the race, Senna assessed his new car's performance: "I had small problems with the gearbox, and the car balance was not optimum, so it was very difficult to drive. I'm looking forward to running a proper circuit with proper conditions and see what the car can do."

Race classification

Championship standings after the race

Drivers' Championship standings

Constructors' Championship standings

References
 Dennis Simanaitis (June, 1991). "3rd United States Grand Prix at Phoenix: More Power To Ya". Road & Track, 133–136.
 "Formula One Phoenix Grand Prix" Video (1992), BMG Video'', New York.

External links

 Sports Illustrated-1991 USGP (archived)
 GrandPrix.com Race Report

United States Grand Prix
United States Grand Prix
Grand Prix
1991 in sports in Arizona
History of Phoenix, Arizona